Tyra Marie White (born Match 23, 1989) is a basketball player who was drafted by the Los Angeles Sparks. She played college basketball for Texas A&M University.

Texas  A&M statistics
Source

References

External links
Texas A&M bio
Tyra White Honors and Awards at macklinlovett.com

1989 births
Living people
American women's basketball players
Basketball players from Kansas City, Missouri
Guards (basketball)
Los Angeles Sparks draft picks
McDonald's High School All-Americans
Texas A&M Aggies women's basketball players